Liu Tianqi (Chinese: 刘天祺; Pinyin: Liú Tiānqí; born 17 January 1989) is a Chinese football player.

Club career
Liu was born in Jixi, Heilongjiang and moved to Shenyang with his family when he was still a boy. He began to play organized football in Zhuang Yi Football School and later moved to Chinese Super League side Shaanxi Baorong Chanba's youth team system. He started his professional football career in 2008 when he was loan to China League Two club Shaanxi Star (Shaanxi Baorong Chanba's youth team) for one year. Liu was promoted to Shaanxi Baorong Chanba's first team squad by Cheng Yaodong in 2009, However, as Shaanxi struggled at the bottom of the league, he did not appear for the club in the 2009 league season. On 9 May 2010, in the first match after Milorad Kosanović took over the club which Shaanxi Baorong Chanba played against Nanchang Hengyuan at home, Liu made his debut for Shaanxi and played as a starter in the right-back position, however, he was substituted by Xin Feng in the 29th minute.

Just playing one match for Shaanxi, Liu was loaned to League Two club Dalian Aerbin in the summer of 2010. He made 10 appearances in the second half of the 2010 season as Dalian Aerbin finished the first place
and won promotion to League One. Dalian Aerbin extended Liu's loan deal for one year in 2011. Liu played 18 matches in the League One, the club won two consecutive champions and promotions and enter the top flight in the 2011 season.

Liu returned to Shaanxi Baorong Chanba which moved their home stadium to Guiyang and changed their name into Guizhou Renhe later for the 2012 Super League campaign. He was highly appraised by the manager Gao Hongbo and gained a regular starter as a full back. He made 32 appearances in the 2012 season as the club achieved fourth place in the Super League and runners-up in the FA Cup and gained the entry into AFC Champions League for the first time.
Liu was excluded from Beijing Renhe's squad in the 2017 season. On 7 April 2017, he received a ban of six months by the Chinese Football Association for age falsification.

On 28 February 2018, Liu transferred to China League One side Dalian Transcendence.

In March 2019, Liu transferred to China League Two side Shenyang Urban. He would go on to win the 2019 China League Two division with the club.

Career statistics 
Statistics accurate as of match played 31 December 2020.

Honours

Club
Dalian Aerbin
 China League One: 2011
 China League Two: 2010

Guizhou Renhe
 Chinese FA Cup: 2013
 Chinese FA Super Cup: 2014

Shenyang Urban
 China League Two: 2019

References

External links
 

Living people
1989 births
People from Jixi
Chinese footballers
Footballers from Heilongjiang
Dalian Professional F.C. players
Beijing Renhe F.C. players
Inner Mongolia Zhongyou F.C. players
Dalian Transcendence F.C. players
Liaoning Shenyang Urban F.C. players
Chinese Super League players
China League One players
China League Two players
 Association football defenders